Mitch Firth (born 28 November 1985 in Sydney, Australia) is an Australian actor best known for his role as Seb Miller in the TV drama series Home and Away.

TV
 Home and Away (2001–04)... as Seb Miller
 All Saints (2000)... Cameron (Ep:First Do No Harm)

External links
 

1985 births
Living people
Australian male child actors
Australian male television actors
Male actors from Sydney
21st-century Australian male actors